Minangkabau may refer to:
 Minangkabau culture, culture of the Minangkabau people
 Minangkabau Culture Documentation and Information Center
 Minangkabau Express, an airport rail link service serving Minangkabau International Airport (see below)
 Minangkabau F.C., a football club based in Padang, West Sumatra
 Minangkabau Highlands, West Sumatra
 Minangkabau International Airport, West Sumatra
 Minangkabau International Airport railway station, an airport railway station
 Minangkabau (legend), a folklore story
 Minangkabau people, an ethnic group indigenous to the Minangkabau Highlands of West Sumatra
 Overseas Minangkabau, demographic group of Minangkabau people of Minangkabau Highlands origin in West Sumatra, Indonesia who have settled in other parts of the world
 Minangkabau language
 Minangkabau War or Padri War, fought in the Minangkabau Highlands from 1803 to 1837

Language and nationality disambiguation pages